"The Girl's Gone Wild" is a song recorded by American country music artist Travis Tritt.  It was released in May 2004 as the first single from the album My Honky Tonk History.  The song reached #28 on the Billboard Hot Country Singles & Tracks chart.  The song was written by Bob DiPiero and Rivers Rutherford.

Chart performance

References

2004 singles
2004 songs
Travis Tritt songs
Songs written by Bob DiPiero
Songs written by Rivers Rutherford
Song recordings produced by Billy Joe Walker Jr.
Columbia Records singles